Auf einen Blick is a German language television and women's magazine published in Hamburg, Germany. It has been in circulation since 1983.

History and profile
Auf einen Blick was founded in 1983. The magazine is part of and published by Bauer Media Group. It is headquartered in Hamburg. It is published on a weekly basis and covers both news on women-related issues and TV programme listings. Its target audience is women older than 40.

Circulation
Auf einen Blick had a circulation of 850,000 copies during the fourth quarter of 1984. During the third quarter of 1992 its circulation was 3,103,000 copies. The circulation of the magazine was 2,706,712 copies between October and December 1994. It was 2,504,000 copies during the third quarter of 1995 and 2,310,000 copies during the third quarter of 1996. 

In 2001 Auf einen Blick had a circulation of 1,981,000 copies, making it the tenth best-selling TV guide worldwide. The magazine had an average circulation of 1,624,000 copies in 2003. In the fourth quarter of 2006 its circulation was 1,514,600 copies. Its circulation was 1,462,074 copies during the second quarter of 2007. In 2010 the magazine had a circulation of 1,261,814 copies.

See also
 List of magazines in Germany

References

External links
 Official website

1983 establishments in West Germany
Bauer Media Group
German-language magazines
Auf einen Blick
Magazines established in 1983
Magazines published in Hamburg
News magazines published in Germany
Television magazines
Weekly magazines published in Germany
Women's magazines published in Germany